The 2016–17 Adelaide Strikers season is stated as follows:

Ladder

Ladder progress

Regular season

Squad
Ages are given as of the opening date of the tournament, 20 December 2016

References

External links
 Official website of the Adelaide Strikers
 Official website of the Big Bash League

Adelaide Strikers seasons